The South African cricket team toured New Zealand from 17 February to 27 March 2012. The tour consisted of three Twenty20 (T20), three One Day Internationals (ODIs) and three Tests.

Squads

Warm-up Game

T20

Twenty20 Series

1st T20I

2nd T20I

3rd T20I

ODI Series

1st ODI

2nd ODI

3rd ODI

Test series

1st Test

2nd Test

3rd Test

References

2011–12 New Zealand cricket season
2012 in South African cricket
2012 in New Zealand cricket
New Zealand
2011–12

mr:भारतीय क्रिकेट संघाचा वेस्ट इंडीझ दौरा, २०११